= Valentine Ehigie Asuen =

Nigerian businessman and politician

Executive Chairman of the Edo State Forestry Commission

CEO of DVD Oil and Gas
- Incumbent
- Assumed office 2024

Personal details
- Party: All Progressives Congress (Suspended)
- Occupation: Businessman, Politician
- Known for: Candidate for Edo South Senatorial District (2023)

Valentine Ehigie Asuen (popularly known as DVD) is a Nigerian businessman and politician from Edo State. He was the All Progressives Congress (APC) candidate for the Edo South Senatorial District in the 2023 Nigerian general election. He has served as the Youth Leader for the Edo State chapter of the APC and as the Executive Chairman of the Edo State Forestry Commission.

== Early life and business career ==
Valentine Asuen was born in Edo State, Nigeria, and is the son of traditional Benin chief Scotty Asuen.

He entered the private sector as an entrepreneur in the downstream petroleum industry, establishing DVD Oil and Gas, an independent petroleum marketing company operating across Edo State.

== Political career ==
Asuen served as a councillor in the Oredo Local Government Council before becoming the State Youth Leader of the All Progressives Congress in Edo State.

=== 2023 Senatorial Candidacy ===
In May 2022, Asuen contested the APC primary election for the Edo South Senatorial District, defeating former Deputy Governor of Edo State, Lucky Imasuen, to secure the party's nomination.

In the general election held on 25 February 2023, Asuen represented the APC in the Edo South Senatorial contest. He was defeated by Neda Imasuen of the Labour Party (LP).

=== Party suspension ===
In August 2025, the Edo State chapter of the All Progressives Congress suspended Asuen from the party.

== Public service ==
Asuen was appointed Executive Chairman of the Edo State Forestry Commission.
